Paint Township is one of the sixteen townships of Wayne County, Ohio, United States.  The 2000 census found 2,823 people in the township, 2,577 of whom lived in the unincorporated portions of the township.

Geography
Located in the southeastern corner of the county, it borders the following townships:
Sugar Creek Township - north
Sugar Creek Township, Stark County - east
Paint Township, Holmes County - south
Salt Creek Township, Holmes County - southwest corner
Salt Creek Township - west
East Union Township - northwest corner

The village of Mount Eaton is located in central Paint Township.

Name and history
Paint Township most likely was named for a local spring where the water was imparted with a reddish hue. It is one of six Paint Townships statewide.

Government
The township is governed by a three-member board of trustees, who are elected in November of odd-numbered years to a four-year term beginning on the following January 1. Two are elected in the year after the presidential election and one is elected in the year before it. There is also an elected township fiscal officer, who serves a four-year term beginning on April 1 of the year after the election, which is held in November of the year before the presidential election. Vacancies in the fiscal officership or on the board of trustees are filled by the remaining trustees.

References

External links
Wayne County township map
County website

Townships in Wayne County, Ohio
Townships in Ohio